Eustace II,, also known as Eustace aux Grenons ("Eustace with long moustaches"), was Count of Boulogne from 1049–1087. He fought on the Norman side at the Battle of Hastings, and afterwards received large grants of land forming an honour in England. He is one of the few proven companions of William the Conqueror. It has been suggested that Eustace was the patron of the Bayeux Tapestry.

Origins
Eustace was the son of Eustace I of Boulogne and Matilda of Louvain.

Career
In 1048 Eustace joined his father-in-law's rebellion against the Emperor Henry III. The next year Eustace was excommunicated by Pope Leo IX for marrying within the prohibited degree of kinship. Eustace and Ida were both descended from Louis II of France, and just within the prohibited seventh degree. However, since not all their ancestors are known, there might have existed a closer relationship. The Pope's action was possibly at the behest of Henry III. The rebellion failed, and in 1049 Eustace and Godfrey submitted to Henry III.

Eustace visited England in 1051, and was  received with honour at the court of Edward the Confessor, his former brother-in-law. Edward attempted to invest Eustace as castellan of a castle in Dover, which was met with resistance by the locals resulting in nearly forty deaths. The brawl in which Eustace and his servants became involved with the citizens of Dover led to a serious quarrel between the king and Godwin. The latter, to whose jurisdiction the men of Dover were subject, refused to punish them. His lack of respect to those in authority became the excuse for his being outlawed together with his family. They left England, but returned the next year in 1052 with a large army, aided by the Flemish.

The following years saw still further advances by Eustace's rivals and enemies. Count Baldwin of Flanders consolidated his hold over territories he had annexed to the east. In 1060 he became tutor of his nephew King Philip I of France. In contrast Eustace's stepson Walter of Mantes failed in his attempt to claim the County of Maine. He was captured by the Normans and died soon afterwards in mysterious circumstances.

Battle of Hastings

These events evidently caused a shift in Eustace's political allegiances, for he then became an important participant in the Norman conquest of England in 1066. He fought at Hastings, although sources vary regarding the details of his conduct during the battle. The contemporary chronicler  William of Poitiers wrote concerning him:

The depiction in the Bayeux Tapestry shows a knight carrying a banner who rides up to Duke William and points excitedly with his finger towards the rear of the Norman advance. William turns his head and lifts up his visor to show his knights following him that he is still alive and determined to fight on. This conforms therefore with Eustace having somewhat lost his nerve and having urged the Duke to retreat while the Battle was at its height with the outcome still uncertain. Other sources suggest that Eustace was present with William at the Malfosse incident in the immediate aftermath of the battle, where a Saxon feigning death leapt up and attacked him, and was presumably cut down before he could reach William.

Eustace received large land grants afterwards, which suggests he contributed in other ways as well, perhaps by providing ships.

Rebellion
In the following year, probably because he was dissatisfied with his share of the spoil, he assisted the Kentishmen in an attempt to seize Dover Castle. The conspiracy failed, and Eustace was sentenced to forfeit his English fiefs. Subsequently, he was reconciled to the Conqueror, who restored a portion of the confiscated lands.

Death
Eustace died circa 1087, and was succeeded by his son, Eustace III.

Marriage and progeny
Eustace married twice: 
Firstly to Goda, daughter of the English king Æthelred the Unready, and sister of Edward the Confessor.  Goda died circa 1047. 
Secondly in about 1049, soon after Goda's death, he married  Ida of Lorraine, daughter of Godfrey III, Duke of Lower Lorraine. Eustace and Ida had three sons:
Eustace III, Count of Boulogne
Godfrey of Bouillon, Defender of the Holy Sepulchre of Jerusalem
Baldwin I of Jerusalem, King of Jerusalem

By his second wife, Eustace may also have had a daughter, Ida, wife of Conon, Count of Montaigu.

Eustace also had a son, Geoffrey fitz Eustace, who married Beatrice de Mandeville, daughter of Geoffrey de Mandeville. Geoffrey and Beatrice were parents of William de Boulogne and grandparents of William's son Faramus de Boulogne.

Cinematic depictions
Eustace has been portrayed on screen by Leslie Bradley in the film Lady Godiva of Coventry (1955) and by Joby Blanshard in the two-part BBC TV play Conquest (1966), part of the series Theatre 625.

See also
Algernon

References

Sources
; ; 

 

1010s births
Place of birth missing
1080s deaths
11th-century Normans
Place of death missing
Companions of William the Conqueror
Norman warriors
People excommunicated by the Catholic Church
House of Boulogne
Counts of Boulogne